Mameyes Arriba is a barrio in the municipality of Jayuya, Puerto Rico. Its population in 2010 was 2,240.

Gallery

See also

 List of communities in Puerto Rico

References

External links

Barrios of Jayuya, Puerto Rico